McKenzie Lake or Lake McKenzie may refer to:

in Australia
Lake McKenzie, a lake in Queensland
Lake Mackenzie (Tasmania), a lake in Tasmania

in Canada
McKenzie Lake, Calgary, a neighborhood of Calgary, Alberta
Ontario
McKenzie Lake (Cochrane District), a lake in Cochrane District
McKenzie Lake (Madawaska River), a lake mostly in Nipissing District and partly in Hastings County, that is part of the Madawaska River (Ontario) drainage basin
 McKenzie Lake, Ontario, a settlement in the township of South Algonquin that is on McKenzie Lake (Madawaska River)
McKenzie Lake (Rainy River District), a lake in Rainy River District and within Quetico Provincial Park
McKenzie Lake (Sudbury District), a lake in Sudbury District near the border with Timiskaming District
McKenzie Lake (Timiskaming District), a lake in Timiskaming District

in the United States
McKenzie Lake (Washington), a lake in Washington state

See also
Lake Helen Mackenzie